Kosala Premaraja Sahabandu (born 13 November 1949), is a Sri Lankan athlete that competed in the 800 metres and 400 metres events.

In 1974 Sahabandu established a new Sri Lanka record for the 800 metres and represented Sri Lanka at the Asian Games in Tehran in the 4 x 400 metres relay winning a gold medal and setting a new Asian Games record of 3 minutes 7.4 seconds. He competed in the 1978 Asian Games in Bangkok but the team failed to medal.

Sahabandu was also a member of the Sri Lanka 4 x 400 relay team at the 1980 Summer Olympics in Moscow. The team came 6th in their first round heat (in a time of 3:14.4) and failed to qualify for further rounds.

In 1982 he competed in his third Asian Games but again the relay team failed to medal.

In 2007 he was appointed the chairman of the National Athletic Selection Committee.

Achievements

References

External links
 

1949 births
Living people
Sportspeople from Matara, Sri Lanka
Sri Lankan male sprinters
Alumni of Rahula College
Olympic athletes of Sri Lanka
Asian Games gold medalists for Sri Lanka
Asian Games medalists in athletics (track and field)
Athletes (track and field) at the 1980 Summer Olympics
Athletes (track and field) at the 1974 Asian Games
Athletes (track and field) at the 1978 Asian Games
Athletes (track and field) at the 1982 Asian Games
Alumni of Mahinda College
Sinhalese sportspeople
Medalists at the 1974 Asian Games